Eidfjord is a municipality in Vestland county, Norway. The municipality is located in the traditional district of Hardanger. The administrative centre of the municipality is the village of Eidfjord, where the majority of the municipal population lives. The other major population centre in the municipality is the village of Øvre Eidfjord.

Eidfjord is situated at the end of the Eid Fjord, an inner branch of the large Hardangerfjorden. The village of Eidfjord is a major cruise ship port of call. Large parts of the Hardangervidda (Europe's largest mountain plateau) are located in Eidfjord. The Hardangervidda Natursenter, a visitors centre and museum for Hardangervidda National Park, is located in Øvre Eidfjord.

The  municipality is the 57th largest by area out of the 356 municipalities in Norway. Eidfjord is the 336th most populous municipality in Norway with a population of 937.

In 2016, the chief of police for Vestlandet formally suggested a reconfiguration of police districts and stations. He proposed that the police station for Ullensvang og Eidfjord be closed.

General information

The parish of Graven (later spelled "Granvin") was established as a municipality on 1 January 1838 (see formannskapsdistrikt law). This large municipality/parish included two annexes: Ulvik and Eidfjord. On 1 January 1859, Ulvik became the main parish, making Granvin and Eidfjord annexes to Ulvik, and the name of the large municipality was changed from Graven to Ulvik.

On 1 May 1891, the municipality of Ulvik was divided into three separate municipalities: the eastern part became the municipality of Graven (population: 1,331) and the southeastern part became the new municipality of Eidfjord (population: 1,018). This left Ulvik as a much smaller municipality. In 1895, a small part of Eidfjord (population: 3) was transferred back to Ulvik.

Eidfjord existed as a municipality from 1891 until 1964 when a major municipal merger took place as a result of municipal reform in Norway due to the Schei Committee. The municipality of Eidfjord (population: 983), most of the municipality of Kinsarvik (population: 1,513), and the municipality of Ullensvang (population: 2,358) were all merged into one large municipality that was named Ullensvang. This merger was not well-liked by the population of Eidsfjord, and so on 1 January 1977, part of the merger was undone, and the area of the "old" Eidfjord municipality (population: 1,223) was separated to form its own municipality once again.

On 1 January 2022, the roughly  Ytre Bu area of Ullensvang Municipality (population: 24) was transferred to the neighboring municipality of Eidfjord.

Name
The municipality is named after the Eid Fjord. The first element is the genitive case of the name of the old Eiðar farm (present-day Eidfjord) which has been the site of the Old Eidfjord Church since the 1300s. The second element is fjord. The name of the farm is the plural form of eið which means "land between two waters" (in this case: the fjord and the lake of Eidfjordvatnet).

Coat of arms
The coat of arms was granted on 13 July 1984. The arms are blue with a silver reindeer antler on the center. The reindeer antler was chosen because the first known settlers of the area were reindeer hunters. The reindeer has been of importance for the population in the Hardangervidda area for many centuries. The antler also symbolizes the rivers that run from the mountain into the fjord.

Churches
The Church of Norway has one parish within the municipality of Eidfjord. It is part of the Hardanger og Voss prosti (deanery) in the Diocese of Bjørgvin.

Geography

Eidfjord municipality sits at the innermost part of the Hardangerfjorden and it stretches inland to include part of the vast Hardangervidda plateau. Part of the Hardangervidda National Park lies in the municipality. Eidfjord municipality borders Ullensvang Municipality to the southwest, the municipalities of Nore og Uvdal and Hol (both in Viken county) to the east, and Ulvik Municipality to the north.

Eidfjord municipality begins at sea level along the fjord, the valleys leading away from the fjord are surrounded by high mountains which lead up to the alpine plateau called Hardangervidda. The Måbødalen valley is a narrow valley that leads upland to the Vøringfossen waterfall. There are several lakes in Eidfjord including Eidfjordvatnet, Nordmannslågen, and Sysenvatnet. The lakes Halnefjorden, Skaupsjøen, and Tinnhølen are all partially located in Eidfjord. The Hardangerjøkulen glacier is partially located in northern Eidfjord.

History
The parish of Eidfjord was very special because it belonged to the Bishop of Stavanger (and not the Bishop of Bergen as all the other parishes in present-day Vestland county) from 1125 until 1630. The Ancient Diocese of Stavanger was created out of the Ancient Diocese of Bergen and it included all of present-day Rogaland and Agder counties, plus the districts of Hallingdal in Viken county and Valdres in Innlandet county, and the parishes of Røldal and Eidfjord in Vestland county. The reason for including Eidfjord was that the regions of Hallingdal and Valdres belonged to the bishop of Stavanger and the easiest way to reach them from Stavanger was by sailing up the Hardangerfjord to Eidfjord, and then traveling over the Hardangervidda plateau to Hallingdal and Valdres.

Government
All municipalities in Norway, including Eidfjord, are responsible for primary education (through 10th grade), outpatient health services, senior citizen services, unemployment and other social services, zoning, economic development, and municipal roads. The municipality is governed by a municipal council of elected representatives, which in turn elect a mayor.  The municipality falls under the Hordaland District Court and the Gulating Court of Appeal.

Municipal council
The municipal council of Eidfjord is made up of 17 representatives that are elected to four year terms. The party breakdown of the council is as follows:

Mayor
The mayors of Eidfjord (incomplete list):
2019–present: Anders Vatle (Sp)
2007-2019: Anved Johan Tveit (Sp)
2003-2007: Ola B. Hereid (LL)
1999-2003: Anved Johan Tveit (Sp)

Notable people 
 Nils Bergslien (1853–1928) a Norwegian illustrator, painter and sculptor; lived and worked in Eidfjord
 Benedicte Maurseth (born 1983 in Eidfjord) a Norwegian traditional folk singer and musician

See also
Fossli Provincial Park, British Columbia, Canada (named after a village in Eidfjord)

References

External links

Municipal fact sheet from Statistics Norway 
Weather information for Eidfjord 

 
Municipalities of Vestland
1891 establishments in Norway
1964 disestablishments in Norway
1977 establishments in Norway